Esra Kürkçü Akgönül (born 5 February 1987) is a Turkish road cyclist and mountain biker.

Personal life
She graduated from the Faculty of Education at Gazi University, and the Faculty of Education at Başkent University in Ankara.

Major results
Source: 

2006
 1st  Cross-country, Balkan Mountain Bike Championships
 1st  Road race, National Road Championships
2007
 3rd Cross-country, National Mountain Bike Championships
2009
 1st  Road race, National Road Championships
2010
 National Road Championships
2nd Road race
3rd Time trial
2011
 National Road Championships
2nd Road race
3rd Time trial
2012
 National Road Championships
2nd Road race
3rd Time trial
 2nd Cross-country, National Mountain Bike Championships
2013
 1st  Cross-country, National Mountain Bike Championships
 National Road Championships
2nd Time trial
3rd Road race
2014
 1st  Cross-country, National Mountain Bike Championships
2015
 National Road Championships
1st  Road race
2nd Time trial
 1st  Cross-country, National Mountain Bike Championships
2018
 2nd Road race, National Road Championships
2021
 2nd Road race, National Road Championships

See also
 Turkish women in sports

References

External links

1987 births
Place of birth missing (living people)
Living people
Turkish female cyclists
Turkish mountain bikers
Marathon mountain bikers
Cyclists at the 2015 European Games
European Games competitors for Turkey